Gottmadingen station is a railway station in the municipality of Gottmadingen, in Baden-Württemberg, Germany. It is located on the standard gauge High Rhine Railway of Deutsche Bahn.

Services
 the following services stop at Gottmadingen:

References

External links
 
 

Railway stations in Baden-Württemberg
Buildings and structures in Konstanz (district)